Godinje (Montenegrin Cyrillic: Годиње) is a village in the municipality of Bar, Montenegro. It is located on a hill overlooking Lake Skadar.

The village is the ancestral home of the Lekovići and Nikač brotherhoods. In 1977, residents of Godinje would say in a joking manner that: "In Godinje, everyone's surname is Leković". A reminder of a time when family clans lived in mountainous isolation in Montenegro.

Demographics
According to the 2011 census, its population was 49.

Ancestral homes
Central: Lekovići (45 houses)
East: Perazići (19 houses)
West: Velovići (4 houses)
West: Nikači (17 houses).

References

Populated places in Bar Municipality